Jacques I (Jacques François Léonor Goyon de Matignon Grimaldi; 21 November 1689 – 23 April 1751) was Prince of Monaco from 1731 to 1733. He was also Duke of Valentinois from 1716 until 1733, and Count of Thorigny.

Life and reign

Jacques came from an ancient Norman family. "Thorigny" is now called Torigni-sur-Vire, where the Mairie is the former family chateau. His uncle was Marshal Charles Auguste de Goÿon de Matignon.

He was a son of Jacques Goÿon de Matignon, jure uxoris Comte de Thorigny, and Charlotte Goyon de Matignon, Comtesse de Thorigny suo jure.

When Antonio I of Monaco and his wife Marie de Lorraine-Armagnac were looking for a consort for their daughter and heir Louise Hippolyte of Monaco, the family proposed him as a candidate. His candidacy was supported by King Louis XIV of France, who wanted to solidify French influence in Monaco.

Jacques and Louise Hippolyte married on 20 October 1715 and had nine children. The wedding ceremony was the first official act that the five-year-old king, Louis XV, carried out during the Regency of Philippe II, Duke of Orléans.

The marriage wasn't very happy. Jacques preferred to stay more in Versailles, where he had several mistresses, than in Monaco.

After the death of Antonio I of Monaco, Louise Hippolyte traveled from Paris to Monaco on 4 April 1731 and received an enthusiastic  reception by the population. When Jacques joined her several times later, the reception was much colder.

Jacques served as regent for his wife from 21 February 1731 to her death. At the end of 1731, Louise Hippolyte died of smallpox. Jacques I neglected the affairs of state and, under pressure from the population, had to leave the country in May 1732. He abdicated in favor of his son Honoré the next year.

He spent the last years of his life in Versailles and Paris. It was at Versailles that Louise-Françoise de Bourbon-Maine, a grand daughter of Louis XIV and his mistress, Madame de Montespan, was proposed as a wife for the widowed prince; despite having a large dowry, (she was the daughter of the Louis-Auguste de Bourbon, duc du Maine and his wife, Anne Louise Bénédicte de Bourbon) the marriage never materialised and the prince never married again.

His Paris residence was named after him Hôtel Matignon and is today the official residence of the Prime Minister of France. Prior to his death, he was a frequent visitor to Versailles with his son.

Issue

Antoine Charles Marie (16 December 1717 – 4 February 1718), "Marquis des Baux Comte de Matignon".
Charlotte Thérèse Nathalie (19 March 1719 – 1790), nun at the Convent of Visitation in Paris.
Honoré III Camille Léonor (10 November 1720 – 21 March 1795), successor of his father.
Charles Marie Auguste (1 January 1722 – 24 August 1749), "Count of Carladés".
Jacques (9 June 1723 – June 1723).
Louise Françoise (15 July 1724 – 15 September 1729), Mademoiselle des Baux.
François Charles (4 February 1726 – 9 December 1743), "Comte de Thorigny".
Charles Maurice (14 May 1727 – 18 January 1798), Count of Valentinois; married on 10 November 1749 to Marie Chrétienne de Rouvroy; no issue.
Marie Françoise Anne Thérése (20 July 1728 – 20 June 1743), Mademoiselle d'Estouteville.

References

  

1689 births
1751 deaths
18th-century Princes of Monaco
Peers created by Louis XV
18th-century viceregal rulers
People from Manche
House of Grimaldi
Princes of Monaco
Monarchs who abdicated
Monegasque princes
Regents of Monaco
Dukes of France
Dukes of Valentinois
Counts of France